The History of the Indian Tribes of North America is a three-volume collection of Native American biographies and accompanying lithograph portraits, originally published in the United States from 1836 to 1844 by Thomas McKenney and James Hall. The majority of the portraits were first painted in oil by Charles Bird King. McKenney was working as the US Superintendent of Indian Trade and would head the Office of Indian Affairs, both within the War Department. He planned publication of the biographical project to be supported by private subscription, as was typical for publishing of the time.

Believing that Native Americans were threatened as a race, McKenney wanted to preserve a record of their leaders for government archives, as well as to share it with the American people. He commissioned Charles Bird King to paint portraits of leaders who came to Washington to negotiate treaties, and James Hall to write biographies of them. The publication project incorporated lithographs made from the paintings.

Background
From about 1821, Thomas McKenney, the U.S. Superintendent of Indian Trade within the War Department, started to commission portraits from Charles Bird King of American Indians who had traveled to Washington, D.C. as delegates to negotiate treaties with the federal government. McKenney continued this project as head of the Office of Indian Affairs, which was also within the War Department. King painted portraits of American Indians up to 1837.  Additional painters commissioned to paint portraits included James Otto Lewis, Peter Rindisbacher, and Henry Inman.

McKenney said he wanted to preserve "in the archives of the Government whatever of the aboriginal man can be rescued from the destruction which awaits his race." He believed that American Indians were threatened as a people by the expansion of European-American society. Aware that there was ill feeling against them by those who wanted their land, he said the American Indians should be "looked upon as human beings, having bodies and souls like ours."

The growing collection of portraits was first housed in the United States Department of War, which then had responsibility for Indian Affairs. In 1858, the original oil paintings were moved to The Castle, the Smithsonian Institution's first building. It was also used as a repository and gallery for artworks.

Publication
To reach a wider public, McKenney commissioned lithographs of the paintings, with each portrait to be supported by a full biography of the subject. The full project was envisioned to be published in three volumes. To research and write those, McKenney commissioned James Hall (1793–1868), a judge and Treasurer of the State of Illinois, who was known as a writer. Hall had difficulty in developing the biographies, as McKenney never provided promised source material. Hall spent eight years tracking and researching the subjects, about whom McKenney had provided little more than names.

The subscription price of $120 for the whole set had seemed high at the beginning of the project, but it was not enough to defray the costs incurred during the exacting production process of the original folio volumes. The Panic of 1837 caused widespread financial distress, and many subscribers to the Folio were unable to pay for their subscriptions. At that time, McKenney withdrew completely from the project.

Hall and a new publisher (C. Rice & A N Hart) brought the series to completion, with the final installment appearing in January 1844. This was long after McKenney had thought he could first publish the portrait/biography project. In the end, it had a total of 1,250 subscribers.

1865 fire at the Smithsonian
In the winter of 1865, workers relocating the portraits brought in a wood-burning stove to provide warmth, and vented the stovepipe into a ventilation shaft which they mistook for a flue. After two weeks, a full fire had ignited in the ventilation shaft. The second floor was engulfed, and the roof of the Castle subsequently collapsed. 

It was the most catastrophic fire in the Smithsonian's history: 295 of the original Indian portraits were consumed; only five were rescued.  Although one of the painters had made a few copies of his favorite portraits for himself, nearly all of the portraits would have been irretrievably lost had McKenney, Hall, and their colleagues not completed the lithography and publication project. The volumes remain a record of prominent Native American leaders of the first half of the 19th century.

Gallery

References

External links

The McKenney & Hall Lithographs of Charles Bird King’s Portraits of American Indians, Smithsonian Institution
McKenney & Hall Collection, Bibliothèque nationale de France 
McKenney & Hall Collection, University of Cincinnati libraries
McKenney & Hall Collection, University of Washington libraries
Native American Portraits, Exhibition, Bancroft Library, University of California Berkeley
McKenney & Hall Collection, University of Georgia libraries

Non-fiction books about indigenous peoples of the Americas
Artifacts in the collection of the Smithsonian Institution